Destroy Destroy Destroy is an American heavy metal band formed in Murfreesboro, Tennessee in February 2003. With a lineup of rhythm guitarist Jeremiah Scott, vocalist Bryan Kemp and drummer Andrew Hall, they began writing songs; soon thereafter Destroy Destroy Destroy completed their outfit with lead guitarist Way Barrier, bassist Adam Phillips and keyboardist Brian Shorter. The group then started playing shows locally and recorded a self-financed EP entitled Kill or Be Killed. They have released two studio albums, Devour the Power (2006) and Battle Sluts (2009), both through Black Market Activities.

The band defines their sound as a blend of "elements from the early thrash metal and glam metal bands of the 1980s and 1990s, to the current sounds of Scandinavian melodic death metal and viking metal bands of today." Destroy Destroy Destroy played their first show in a pizzeria as opening band for Mastodon.

Musical style and influences 
Destroy Destroy Destroy's musical style was described by critics with a variety of music genres, such as, melodic death metal, power metal, symphonic black metal, thrash metal, and viking metal. Chad Bowar of About.com, defined Destroy Destroy Destroy as a "versatile band, which incorporates many genres into their sound" and that "their songs are sometimes orchestral and majestic with lots of keyboards, and other times harsh and intense with blast beats and breakdowns." Bowar noted Destroy Destroy Destroy's musical traits, stating, "The Viking influence comes with spoken word interludes and lyrics talking about battles, mythical beasts and lost worlds. Destroy Destroy Destroy also has a lot of Bay Area thrash influences along with European melodic death stylings. Power metal is another genre their music encompasses with frenetic guitar shredding, epic arrangements and atmospheric keyboards."

Allmusic writer Alex Henderson, stated that Devour the Power "would have been identified as a power metal-oriented disc with progressive metal influences, some thrash [metal] parts and some black metal-style blast beats." Even defining Destroy Destroy Destroy as a symphonic black metal act, Henderson observed, "Battle Sluts, like other symphonic black metal discs, was not recorded with black metal purists in mind; Destroy Destroy Destroy aren't pretending to be Gorgoroth or Marduk, and melody is a high priority throughout this Viking-themed outing."

Although the band is native of Tennessee, their music "employ the techniques and styles of metal made popular in Europe", specifically the Scandinavian countries like Norway, Sweden, and/or Finland—with a "Nordic-sound", blending "melody and aggression". Destroy Destroy Destroy is compared to bands like Iron Maiden, Queensrÿche, Manowar, Judas Priest, and Dream Theater, citing as influence Metallica and Pantera.

Discography
Studio albums
Devour the Power (2006)
Battle Sluts (2009)

EPs
Kill or Be Killed (2003)

Members
Current
Jeremiah Scott – rhythm guitar (2003–present)
Way Barrier – lead guitar (2003–present)
Adam Phillips – bass (2003–present)
Brian Shorter – keyboards (2007–present)
Andrew Core – drums (2009–present)
Chris Bazor – vocals (2009–present)

Former
Eric W. Brown – drums (2004–2008)
Andrew Hall – drums (2003–2004)
David Shaw – drums (2008–2009)
Jessica Lambert – keyboards (2006)
Alex Gellette – keyboards (2003–2006)
Keith Williams – keyboards (2006)
Courtney Edwards – keyboards (2006–2008)
Bryan Kemp – vocals (2003–2009)

Timeline

References 

Musical groups established in 2003
Heavy metal musical groups from Tennessee
Black Market Activities artists
Viking metal musical groups
American melodic death metal musical groups
American thrash metal musical groups
Symphonic black metal musical groups
American power metal musical groups